Alibertia edulis is a species of tree in the family Rubiaceae. It is native to the tropical forests of the Americas.

Description 
Alibertia edulis is an evergreen dioecious tree up to 25 feet (7.5m) tall at maturity, with light brownish bark and opposite, ovate, dark green leaves that have a smooth margin. The flowers are tubular to trumpet-shaped, white, hairy, in 4-8" panicles, with 4-5 petals. The fruit is yellow, egg-shaped, ovate, edible, and made into jam or juices. The fruits are collected from trees in the wild, as this species is seldom cultivated.

References

Cordiereae
Trees of Peru
Trees of Brazil
Trees of Mexico
Trees of Bolivia
Trees of Central America